ACTSA: Action for Southern Africa is the successor organisation to the Anti-Apartheid Movement in the United Kingdom. Established in 1994, ACTSA has since been campaigning with the people of Southern Africa as they strive to build a better future; working for peace, democracy and development across the region. It is a coalition member of the Stop AIDS Campaign, the Trade Justice Movement, and Stop Climate Chaos.

ACTSA influences decision makers of British and European policies that affect Southern Africa. It keeps the region in the public and political spotlight through lobbying, publication of reports and briefings, and media work. ACTSA also inspires change and humanitarian relief through direct action in the southern African region.

ACTSA is a democratic not for profit organisation funded by its members and supporters. Individual members and affiliated trade unions, union branches and local groups shape its agenda and lead the campaigns. ACTSA is governed by a constitution and set of standing orders.

References

External links 
 Action for Southern Africa homepage

Organisations based in London
Political organisations based in the United Kingdom